Obnorskaya Sloboda is a rural locality (a village) in Rostilovskoye Rural Settlement, Gryazovetsky District, Vologda Oblast, Russia. The population was 27 as of 2002.

Geography 
Obnorskaya Sloboda is located 18 km south of Gryazovets (the district's administrative centre) by road. Zayemye is the nearest rural locality.

References 

Rural localities in Gryazovetsky District